Houghton Brook is a minor tributary of the River Lea. Houghton Brook starts in Houghton Regis and is fed by a number of smaller brooks in the area, mostly supplied by surface water from farmland and the various local villages and housing estates.

The Houghton Brook starts behind the Pavilion on Houghton Regis Village Green and wends eastward though Houghton Brook flows through Houghton Regis, Lewsey and Hockwell Ring before joining the River Lea in Leagrave.

References

Rivers of Bedfordshire
Tributaries of the River Lea
1Houghton
Luton